Duncan Norvelle (born 2 April 1958, Hoton, Loughborough, Leicestershire, England) is an English comedian in the variety tradition, who appeared on British television from the early 1980s. He was often referred to as Duncan "Chase me" Norvelle, stemming from his catchphrase "Chase me!". His act was based on appearing to be a stereotypical camp homosexual.

Entertainment career
In the mid 80s, he hosted an unscreened pilot dating show called It's a Hoot for London Weekend Television. The series was eventually re-titled Blind Date and hosted by Liverpudlian singer and entertainer Cilla Black. In 1991, Duncan appeared on the ITV comedy panel game show Through the Keyhole. 2008 saw him go out on tour as part of the Ricky Tomlinson Laughter Show. Norvelle spent the 2009 pantomime season playing Buttons in Cinderella in Doncaster, South Yorkshire.

In 2011, he appeared on Celebrity Come Dine with Me with Sean Hughes, Gina Yashere and Paul Tonkinson.

Health
Norvelle was hospitalised in 2012 after suffering a stroke, leaving him paralysed down the left side of his body. After nine weeks in hospital, he cancelled his summer season with comedy duo Cannon and Ball, and was replaced by Stu Francis.

In 2015, Norvelle chose the Embassy Theatre, Skegness, as his first performance after over three years off-stage, promising that funds from his show would be allocated to the Stroke Association.

References

External links

1958 births
Living people
British comedians
People from the Borough of Charnwood